Meteorite fall statistics are frequently used by planetary scientists to approximate the true flux of meteorites on Earth. Meteorite falls are those meteorites that are collected soon after being witnessed to fall, whereas meteorite finds are discovered at a later time. Although there are 30 times as much finds than falls, their raw distribution of types does not accurately reflect what falls to Earth. The reasons for this include the following:
Some meteorite types are easier to find than others.
Some meteorite types are degraded by weathering more quickly than others.
Some meteorites, especially iron meteorites, may have been collected by people in the past who recognized them as being unusual and/or useful, thereby removing them from the scientific record.
Many meteorites fall as showers of many stones, but when they are collected long after the event it may be difficult to tell which ones were part of the same fall.
Many meteorites are found by people who sell meteorites... valuable, rare types become known to science quickly, while those of low value may never be described.

There have been many attempts to correct statistical analyses of meteorite finds for some of these effects, especially to estimate the frequency with which rare meteorite types fall.  For example, there are over 100 known lunar meteorite finds, but none has ever been observed to fall.  However, for abundant types, meteorite fall statistics are generally preferred.

These statistics are current through June 9, 2012.

Statistics by material

For most meteorite falls, even those that occurred long ago or for which material has never received complete scientific characterization, it is known whether the object was a stone, stony iron, or iron meteorite.  Here are the numbers and percentages of each type, based on literature data.

Statistics by major category

The traditional way of subdividing meteorites (see Meteorites classification) is into irons, stony-irons, and two major groups of stony meteorites, chondrites and achondrites. For some of the less-studied stony meteorite falls, it is not known whether the object is chondritic; thus the number of meteorites that can be so grouped is 4% lower than shown above.  These numbers are shown in the next table.  One could make a slight correction for the undercounting of stony meteorites (e.g., the percentage of irons would decrease by a 0.2%), but this was not done.

Statistics by meteorite group

Probably the most useful statistical breakdown of meteorite falls is by group, which is the fundamental way that meteorites are classified.  About 5% of the meteorites in the table just above have not been sufficiently classified to allow them to be put into such groups.  Again, a small adjustment could be made to the percentages to correct for this effect, but it does not greatly change the results.  Note that a number of meteorite groups are only represented by a small number of falls; the percentages of falls belonging to these groups have a large uncertainty.

Statistics by country

Statistics by continent and time

Notes

See also
 Glossary of meteoritics

References